Reginald "Reggie" Perry, better known as Syience, is a Grammy Award-winning American songwriter, record producer and musician from Flint, Michigan. He has worked with a number of recognizable and respected artists, including Beyoncé, Cheryl Cole, Jay-Z, John Legend, Mary J. Blige, Ne-Yo and more. Syience won two Grammys for his work on Mary J. Blige's Growing Pains and Ne-Yo's Because of You.

Production credits

2006
 Jay-Z – Kingdom Come
 10. "Hollywood" (featuring Beyoncé)

2007
 Ne-Yo – Because of You
 10. "Angel"

 Mary J. Blige – Growing Pains
 15. "Smoke"

 Ghostface Killah – The Big Doe Rehab
 16. "Slow Down" (featuring Chrisette Michelle) (UK Bonus Track)

2008
 Danity Kane – Welcome to the Dollhouse
 13. "Key to My Heart""

 Ne-Yo – Year of the Gentleman
 02. "So You Can Cry"

 John Legend – Evolver
 10. "Take Me Away"

 Beyoncé – I Am... Sasha Fierce
 01. "If I Were a Boy" (Additional drums, guitar by Syience)

2009
 Fabolous – Loso's Way
 15. "Stay" (featuring Marsha Ambrosius)

 Cheryl Cole – 3 Words
 02. "Parachute"
 09. "Don't Talk About This Love"

 Wale – Attention Deficit
 11. "Contemplate" (featuring Rihanna)

 J. Cole – The Warm Up
 "Can I Live"

 Ciara – Fantasy Ride
 "Fit of Love"

2010
 Sugababes – Sweet 7
 08. "Give It To Me Now"
 Stat Quo – Statlanta
 02. "Welcome Back" (featuring Marsha Ambrosius)
 J. Cole – Friday Night Lights
 "2Face"
 J. Cole – American Dreamin' Mixtape (unused track)
 "I'm on It"
 Ne-Yo – Libra Scale
 07. "Genuine Only"

2011
 Marsha Ambrosius – Late Nights & Early Mornings
 11. "Chasing Clouds"
 Lupe Fiasco – Lasers
 12. "Never Forget You" (featuring John Legend) (produced with Jerry Duplessis & Arden Altino)
 Donnis – Southern Lights
 00. "Ring My Bell" (featuring Dev)

2012
 Delilah – From The Roots Up
 3. "I Can Feel You"
 7. "21"
 9. "Shades of Grey
 10. "Love You So"
 11. "Insecure"

Frank Ocean Channel Orange

1. "Fertilizer"

2013
Gabrielle – Now And Always 20 Years of Dreaming
4. "Knew Me"
14. "Holding On For You"
 J. Cole – Born Sinner
Interlude

References

External links
www.discogs.com for Syience

Record producers from Michigan
Living people
Year of birth missing (living people)